Cobaki is a town located in north-eastern New South Wales, Australia, in the Tweed Shire.

Demographics

The median age of the Cobaki population was 38 years, 1 year above the national median of 37.

89% of people living in Cobaki were born in Australia. The other top responses for country of birth were New Zealand 2.6%, China 2.2%, Scotland 1.3%, England 1.3%.

96.5% of people spoke only English at home; the next most common languages were 1.8% French, 1.8% Mandarin,

References 

Suburbs of Tweed Heads, New South Wales